Vesicephalus is a genus of globular springtails in the family Katiannidae. There are at least four described species in Vesicephalus.

Species
These four species belong to the genus Vesicephalus:
 Vesicephalus crossleyi Snider, RJ, 1985
 Vesicephalus europaeus Ardanaz & Pozo, 1986
 Vesicephalus longisetis (Guthrie, 1903)
 Vesicephalus occidentalis (Mills, 1935)

References

Further reading

 

Collembola
Articles created by Qbugbot
Springtail genera